Jessica Frazier is Lecturer in Theology and Religion at Trinity College, Oxford,  and a Fellow of the Oxford Centre for Hindu studies. Her work explores key philosophical themes across cultures, from Indian concepts of Being to 20th century phenomenology. She is particularly interested in questions about ontology, value, selfhood and human flourishing.

Frazier is the founding editor of the Journal of Hindu Studies.

Selected publications

References

External links 
 Jessica Frazier on Creation Myths on BBC Radio 4: Jessica Frazier discusses creation myths from around the world.
 Jessica Frazier on Indian Philosophy from History of Philosophy Without Any Gaps: An interview with Jessica Frazier about philosophical ideas and arguments in the Vedas, Upanisads and later Hindu texts.
 Beautiful Structures: Gadamer on Beauty, Love, Faith, and the Nature of Value from Transpositions: Jessica Frazier on Gadamer's approach to beauty, love and value.
 Dr Jessica Frazier speaking on Gadamer and Religion (video) from the St John's College, Nottingham Timeline project: Jessica Frazier explains Gadamer's thought, and explores his significance for the study of religion.
 Lakshmi, BBC Radio 4 In Our Time: Jessica Frazier on the panel with Jacqueline Suthren-Hirst and Chakravarthi Ram-Prasad.

British women academics
Living people
Year of birth missing (living people)